Lê Lương Minh (born 1 September 1952) is a Vietnamese politician and diplomat who served as the 13th secretary-general of ASEAN between 2013 and 2017.

Early life
Lê Lương Minh graduated from the Diplomatic Academy of Vietnam in Hanoi, Vietnam in 1974, and the Jawaharlal Nehru University in New Delhi, India.

Political career
In 1975, he began his career in Vietnam's Ministry of Foreign Affairs. He was appointed Deputy Director-General for International Organisations in 1993. In 1995, he was appointed as Ambassador – Permanent Representative to the United Nations Office and Other International Organisations in Geneva. In 1997, he was appointed as Ambassador – Deputy Permanent Representative to the United Nations at Headquarters. Since February 17, 2004, he has been Vietnam's ambassador to the United Nations in New York City. He held this office from 1995 to 1997 for the UN institutions in Geneva and as a deputy in New York City from 1997 to 1999. He was the President of the United Nations Security Council in July 2008 and October 2009. He was nominated ASEAN Secretary-General by the government of Vietnam, a post which he took over on January 1, 2013. The ASEAN leaders endorsed him as ASEAN Secretary-General for 2013–2017 in a ceremony at the bloc's headquarter in Jakarta on January 7, 2013.

Personal life
He is a native of Thanh Hóa, a coastal town 150 kilometers south of Vietnam's capital Hanoi. He is married and has two daughters.

References

1952 births
Communist Party of Vietnam politicians
Living people
Permanent Representatives of Vietnam to the United Nations
Vietnamese diplomats
Jawaharlal Nehru University alumni